The 2017–18 Charlotte Hornets season was the 28th season of the franchise in the National Basketball Association (NBA) and the fifth season under head coach Steve Clifford. It was also the last season where Rich Cho is the general manager for the Hornets and the last where Steve Clifford is the head coach, as well as Mitch Kupchak's first year with Charlotte.

On March 28, 2018 against the Cleveland Cavaliers, Kemba Walker surpassed Dell Curry to become the franchise's all-time leader in points. The Hornets equaled their record from last season and went on to miss playoff contention for the second straight season.

On April 8, 2018, Kupchak was hired as the president of basketball operations and general manager of the Charlotte Hornets.

On April 13, 2018, the Hornets' president of basketball operations and general manager Kupchak announced that the team had relieved Steve Clifford of his head coaching duties.

NBA draft

Roster

<noinclude>

Game log

Pre-season

|- style="background:#fcc"
| 1
| October 2
| @ Boston
| 
| Kemba Walker (12)
| Dwight Howard (10)
| Lamb, Walker (3)
| TD Garden18,624
| 0–1
|- style="background:#cfc"
| 2
| October 4
| @ Detroit
| 
| Malik Monk (19)
| Dwight Howard (11)
| Julyan Stone (7)
| Little Caesars Arena13,882
| 1–1
|- style="background:#fcc;"
| 3
| October 9
| @ Miami
| 
| Malik Monk (19)
| Cody Zeller (8)
| Malik Monk (4)
| American Airlines Arena19,600
| 1–2
|- style="background:#fcc;"
| 4
| October 11
| Boston
| 
| Malik Monk (21)
| Cody Zeller (9)
| Kemba Walker (6)
| Spectrum CenterN/A
| 1–3
|- style="background:#cfc;"
| 5
| October 13
| Dallas
| 
| Kemba Walker (18)
| Dwight Howard (12)
| Bacon, Walker (4)
| Spectrum Center10,018
| 2–3

Regular season

|- style="background:#fcc;"
| 1
| October 18
| @ Detroit
| 
| Kemba Walker (24)
| Dwight Howard (15)
| Kemba Walker (4)
| Little Caesars Arena20,491
| 0–1
|- style="background:#cfc;"
| 2
| October 20
| Atlanta
| 
| Kemba Walker (26)
| Dwight Howard (15)
| Kemba Walker (9)
| Spectrum Center18,417
| 1–1
|- style="background:#fcc;"
| 3
| October 23
| @ Milwaukee
| 
| Frank Kaminsky (18)
| Dwight Howard (22)
| Kemba Walker (6)
| Bradley Center12,887
| 1–2
|- style="background:#cfc;"
| 4
| October 25
| Denver
| 
| Frank Kaminsky (20)
| Dwight Howard (19)
| Lamb, Walker (5)
| Spectrum Center14,253
| 2–2
|- style="background:#fcc;"
| 5
| October 27
| Houston
| 
| Kemba Walker (26)
| Dwight Howard (16)
| Kemba Walker (5)
| Spectrum Center17,339
| 2–3
|- style="background:#cfc;"
| 6
| October 29
| Orlando
| 
| Kemba Walker (34)
| Marvin Williams (11)
| Kemba Walker (10)
| Spectrum Center15,531
| 3–3
|- style="background:#cfc;"
| 7
| October 30
| @ Memphis
| 
| Kemba Walker (27)
| Lamb, Williams, Zeller (8)
| Kemba Walker (6)
| FedExForum15,711
| 4–3

|- style="background:#cfc;"
| 8
| November 1
| Milwaukee
| 
| Kemba Walker (26)
| Dwight Howard (11)
| Treveon Graham (5)
| Spectrum Center15,655
| 5–3
|- style="background:#fcc;"
| 9
| November 3
| @ San Antonio
| 
| Dwight Howard (20)
| Dwight Howard (13)
| Jeremy Lamb (6)
| AT&T Center18,418
| 5–4
|- style="background:#fcc;"
| 10
| November 5
| @ Minnesota
| 
| Cody Zeller (16)
| Howard, Zeller (9)
| Kemba Walker (9)
| Target Center14,124
| 5–5
|- style="background:#fcc;"
| 11
| November 7
| @ New York
| 
| Howard, Monk, Walker (21)
| Dwight Howard (9)
| Kemba Walker (7)
| Madison Square Garden18,704
| 5–6
|- style="background:#fcc;"
| 12
| November 10
| @ Boston
| 
| Kemba Walker (20)
| Dwight Howard (11)
| Kemba Walker (11)
| TD Garden18,624
| 5–7
|- style="background:#fcc;"
| 13
| November 15
| Cleveland
| 
| Michael Kidd-Gilchrist (22)
| Kidd-Gilchrist, Kaminsky (6)
| Kemba Walker (7)
| Spectrum Center19,427
| 5–8
|- style="background:#fcc;"
| 14
| November 17
| @ Chicago
| 
| Kemba Walker (47)
| Dwight Howard (9)
| Kemba Walker (5)
| United Center20,493
| 5–9
|- style="background:#cfc;"
| 15
| November 18
| L.A. Clippers
| 
| Kemba Walker (26)
| Dwight Howard (16)
| Nicolas Batum (7)
| Spectrum Center17,640
| 6–9
|- style="background:#cfc;"
| 16
| November 20
| Minnesota
| 
| Dwight Howard (25)
| Dwight Howard (20)
| Michael Carter-Williams (4)
| Spectrum Center15,978
| 7–9
|- style="background:#cfc;"
| 17
| November 22
| Washington
| 
| Dwight Howard (26)
| Dwight Howard (13)
| Jeremy Lamb (5)
| Spectrum Center16,041
| 8–9
|- style="background:#fcc;"
| 18
| November 24
| @ Cleveland
| 
| Dwight Howard (20)
| Dwight Howard (13)
| Kemba Walker (8)
| Quicken Loans Arena20,562
| 8–10
|- style="background:#fcc;"
| 19
| November 25
| San Antonio
| 
| Kemba Walker (18)
| Dwight Howard (11)
| Kemba Walker (5)
| Spectrum Center18,597
| 8–11
|- style="background:#fcc;"
| 20
| November 29
| @ Toronto
| 
| Dwight Howard (22)
| Dwight Howard (10)
| Batum, Carter-Williams (5)
| Air Canada Centre19,800
| 8–12

|- style="background:#fcc;"
| 21
| December 1
| @ Miami
| 
| Marvin Williams (16)
| Dwight Howard (9)
| Michael Carter-Williams (6)
| American Airlines Arena19,600
| 8–13
|- style="background:#cfc;"
| 22
| December 4
| Orlando
| 
| Kemba Walker (29)
| Nicolas Batum (11)
| Nicolas Batum (7)
| Spectrum Center14,419
| 9–13
|- style="background:#fcc;"
| 23
| December 6
| Golden State
| 
| Kemba Walker (24)
| Cody Zeller (8)
| Kemba Walker (5)
| Spectrum Center19,334
| 9–14
|- style="background:#fcc;"
| 24
| December 8
| Chicago
| 
| Dwight Howard (25)
| Dwight Howard (20)
| Nicolas Batum (10)
| Spectrum Center14,077
| 9–15
|- style="background:#fcc;"
| 25
| December 9
| L.A. Lakers
| 
| Kemba Walker (23)
| Dwight Howard (12)
| Kemba Walker (1)
| Spectrum Center19,320
| 9–16
|- style="background:#cfc;"
| 26
| December 11
| @ Oklahoma City
| 
| Dwight Howard (23)
| Dwight Howard (7)
| Kemba Walker (9)
| Chesapeake Energy Arena18,203
| 10–16
|- style="background:#fcc;"
| 27
| December 13
| @ Houston
| 
| Dwight Howard (26)
| Dwight Howard (18)
| Batum, Walker, Carter-Williams (3)
| Toyota Center16,509
| 10–17
|- style="background:#fcc;"
| 28
| December 15
| Miami
| 
| Kemba Walker (25)
| Dwight Howard (16)
| Nicolas Batum (10)
| Spectrum Center15,565
| 10–18
|- style="background:#fcc;"
| 29
| December 16
| Portland
| 
| Nicolas Batum (23)
| Dwight Howard (15)
| Kemba Walker (6)
| Spectrum Center16,687
| 10–19
|- style="background:#cfc;"
| 30
| December 18
| New York
| 
| Frank Kaminsky (24)
| Michael Kidd-Gilchrist (9)
| Kemba Walker (6)
| Spectrum Center15,386
| 11–19
|- style="background:#fcc;"
| 31
| December 20
| Toronto
| 
| Jeremy Lamb (32)
| Dwight Howard (9)
| Nicolas Batum (5)
| Spectrum Center15,023
| 11–20
|- style="background:#fcc;"
| 32
| December 22
| @ Milwaukee
| 
| Kemba Walker (32)
| Marvin Williams (10)
| Nicolas Batum (6)
| Bradley Center17,018
| 11–21
|- style="background:#cfc;"
| 33
| December 23
| Milwaukee
| 
| Dwight Howard (21)
| Dwight Howard (16)
| Kemba Walker (8)
| Spectrum Center 18,363
|  12–21
|- style="background:#fcc;"
| 34
| December 27
| Boston
| 
| Kemba Walker (24)
| Dwight Howard (17)
| Kemba Walker (5)
| Spectrum Center19,611
| 12–22
|- style="background:#cfc;"
| 35
| December 29
| @ Golden State
| 
| Dwight Howard (29)
| Dwight Howard (12)
| Dwight Howard (7)
| Oracle Arena19,596
| 13–22
|- style="background:#fcc;"
| 36
| December 31
| @ L.A. Clippers
| 
| Kemba Walker (30)
| Dwight Howard (10)
| Nicolas Batum (6)
| Staples Center17,348
| 13–23

|- style="background:#cfc;"
| 37
| January 2
| @ Sacramento
| 
| Dwight Howard (20)
| Dwight Howard (8)
| Kemba Walker (10)
| Golden 1 Center17,583
| 14–23
|- style="background:#cfc;"
| 38
| January 5
| @ L.A. Lakers
| 
| Kemba Walker (19)
| Dwight Howard (10)
| Kemba Walker (7)
| Staples Center18,997
| 15–23
|- style="background:#fcc;"
| 39
| January 10
| Dallas
| 
| Kemba Walker (41)
| Dwight Howard (12)
| Kemba Walker (4)
| Spectrum Center14,462
| 15–24
|- style="background:#cfc;"
| 40
| January 12
| Utah
| 
| Kemba Walker (22)
| Dwight Howard (13)
| Kemba Walker (6)
| Spectrum Center14,848
| 16–24
|- style="background:#fcc;"
| 41
| January 13
| Oklahoma City
| 
| Kemba Walker (19)
| Dwight Howard (17)
| Marvin Williams (4)
| Spectrum Center19,624
| 16–25
|- style="background:#cfc;"
| 42
| January 15
| @ Detroit
| 
| Dwight Howard (21)
| Dwight Howard (17)
| Kemba Walker (9)
| Little Caesars Arena17,200
| 17–25
|- style="background:#cfc;"
| 43
| January 17
| Washington
| 
| Michael Kidd-Gilchrist (21)
| Dwight Howard (15)
| Kemba Walker (7)
| Spectrum Center11,528
| 18–25
|- style="background:#fcc;"
| 44
| January 20
| Miami
| 
| Nicolas Batum (26)
| Dwight Howard (15)
| Kemba Walker (7)
| Spectrum Center18,687
| 18–26
|- style="background:#cfc;"
| 45
| January 22
| Sacramento
| 
| Kemba Walker (26)
| Dwight Howard (16)
| Kemba Walker (9)
| Spectrum Center11,806
| 19–26
|- style="background:#fcc;"
| 46
| January 24
| New Orleans
| 
| Dwight Howard (22)
| Dwight Howard (16)
| Kemba Walker (7)
| Spectrum Center14,588
| 19–27
|- style="background:#cfc;"
| 47
| January 26
| Atlanta
| 
| Kemba Walker (29)
| Dwight Howard (15)
| Nicolas Batum (8)
| Spectrum Center15,479
| 20–27
|- style="background:#fcc;"
| 48
| January 27
| @ Miami
| 
| Kemba Walker (30)
| Dwight Howard (16)
| Kemba Walker (5)
| American Airlines Arena19,600
| 20–28
|- style="background:#fcc;"
| 49
| January 29
| @ Indiana
| 
| Kemba Walker (23)
| Dwight Howard (11)
| Kemba Walker (4)
| Bankers Life Fieldhouse14,225
| 20–29
|- style="background:#cfc;"
| 50
| January 31
| @ Atlanta
| 
| Kemba Walker (30)
| Dwight Howard (16)
| Nicolas Batum (10)
| Philips Arena13,103
| 21–29

|- style="background:#cfc;"
| 51
| February 2
| Indiana
| 
| Kemba Walker (41)
| Dwight Howard (11)
| Kemba Walker (9)
| Spectrum Center17,135
| 22–29
|- style="background:#cfc;"
| 52
| February 4
| @ Phoenix
| 
| Nicolas Batum (22)
| Dwight Howard (14)
| Batum, Walker (5)
| Talking Stick Resort Arena14,487
| 23–29
|- style="background:#fcc;"
| 53
| February 5
| @ Denver
| 
| Kemba Walker (20)
| Cody Zeller (10)
| Nicolas Batum (5)
| Pepsi Center14,410
| 23–30
|- style="background:#fcc;"
| 54
| February 8
| @ Portland
| 
| Kemba Walker (40)
| Dwight Howard (15)
| Nicolas Batum (5)
| Moda Center19,178
| 23–31
|- style="background:#fcc;"
| 55
| February 9
| @ Utah
| 
| Kemba Walker (19)
| Dwight Howard (9)
| Kemba Walker (5)
| Vivint Smart Home Arena18,306
| 23–32
|- style="background:#fcc;"
| 56
| February 11
| Toronto
| 
| Kemba Walker (23)
| Dwight Howard (13)
| Kemba Walker (9)
| Spectrum Center18,320
| 23–33
|- style="background:#cfc;"
| 57
| February 14
| @ Orlando
| 
| Dwight Howard (22)
| Dwight Howard (13)
| Nicolas Batum (7)
| Amway Center18,428
| 24–33
|- style="background:#cfc;"
| 58
| February 22
| Brooklyn
| 
| Kemba Walker (31)
| Dwight Howard (24)
| Batum, Walker (7)
| Spectrum Center14,112
| 25–33
|- style="background:#cfc;"
| 59
| February 23
| @ Washington
| 
| Frank Kaminsky (25)
| Kemba Walker (7)
| Nicolas Batum (8)
| Capital One Arena17,824
| 26–33
|- style="background:#cfc;"
| 60
| February 25
| Detroit
| 
| Howard, Walker (17)
| Dwight Howard (12)
| Nicolas Batum (9)
| Spectrum Center17,894
| 27–33
|- style="background:#cfc;"
| 61
| February 27
| Chicago
| 
| Kemba Walker (31)
| Nicolas Batum (7)
| Nicolas Batum (12)
| Spectrum Center14,521
| 28–33
|- style="background:#fcc;"
| 62
| February 28
| @ Boston
| 
| Kemba Walker (23)
| Marvin Williams (9)
| Nicolas Batum (10)
| TD Garden18,624
| 28–34

|- style="background:#fcc;"
| 63
| March 2
| @ Philadelphia
| 
| Kemba Walker (31)
| Nicolas Batum (13)
| Nicolas Batum (8)
| Wells Fargo Center20,487
| 28–35
|- style="background:#fcc;"
| 64
| March 4
| @ Toronto
| 
| Kemba Walker (27)
| Dwight Howard (10)
| Nicolas Batum (8)
| Air Canada Centre19,800
| 28–36
|- style="background:#fcc;"
| 65
| March 6
| Philadelphia
| 
| Dwight Howard (30)
| Dwight Howard (6)
| Nicolas Batum (10)
| Spectrum Center15,600
| 28–37
|- style="background:#fcc;"
| 66
| March 8
| Brooklyn
| 
| Kemba Walker (21)
| Dwight Howard (7)
| Kemba Walker (6)
| Spectrum Center14,173
| 28–38
|- style="background:#cfc;"
| 67
| March 10
| Phoenix
| 
| Dwight Howard (30)
| Batum, Howard (12)
| Batum, Walker (7)
| Spectrum Center19,336
| 29–38
|- style="background:#fcc;"
| 68
| March 13
| @ New Orleans
| 
| Howard, Walker (22)
| Dwight Howard (11)
| Nicolas Batum (8)
| Smoothie King Center15,507
| 29–39
|- style="background:#cfc;"
| 69
| March 15
| @ Atlanta
| 
| Dwight Howard (33)
| Dwight Howard (12)
| Nicolas Batum (16)
| Philips Arena14,486
| 30–39
|- style="background:#fcc;"
| 70
| March 17
| @ New York
| 
| Dwayne Bacon (15)
| Dwight Howard (13)
| Dwayne Bacon (3)
| Madison Square Garden17,760
| 30–40
|- style="background:#fcc;"
| 71
| March 19
| @ Philadelphia
| 
| Kemba Walker (24)
| Batum, Walker (8)
| Kemba Walker (6)
| Wells Fargo Center20,530
| 30–41
|- style="background:#cfc;"
| 72
| March 21
| @ Brooklyn
| 
| Dwight Howard (32)
| Dwight Howard (30)
| Kemba Walker (6)
| Barclays Center10,231
| 31–41
|- style="background:#cfc;"
| 73
| March 22
| Memphis
| 
| Kemba Walker (46)
| Willy Hernangómez (12)
| Jeremy Lamb (6)
| Spectrum Center15,033
| 32–41
|- style="background:#cfc;"
| 74
| March 24
| @ Dallas
| 
| Kemba Walker (24)
| Dwight Howard (22)
| Frank Kaminsky (6)
| American Airlines Center20,085
| 33–41
|- style="background:#cfc;"
| 75
| March 26
| New York
| 
| Kemba Walker (31)
| Dwight Howard (13)
| Kemba Walker (7)
| Spectrum Center14,487
| 34–41
|- style="background:#fcc;"
| 76
| March 28
| Cleveland
| 
| Kemba Walker (21)
| Dwight Howard (10)
| Nicolas Batum (5)
| Spectrum Center19,474
| 34–42
|- style="background:#fcc;"
| 77
| March 31
| @ Washington
| 
| Dwight Howard (22)
| Dwight Howard (13)
| Nicolas Batum (7)
| Capital One Arena19,071
| 34–43

|- style="background:#fcc;"
| 78
| April 1
| Philadelphia
| 
| Kidd-Gilchrist, Monk (16)
| Willy Hernangomez (11)
| Kemba Walker (4)
| Spectrum Center17,005
| 34–44
|- style="background:#fcc;"
| 79
| April 3
| @ Chicago
| 
| Dwight Howard (23)
| Dwight Howard (17)
| Nicolas Batum (5)
| United Center20,139
| 34–45
|- style="background:#cfc;"
| 80
| April 6
| @ Orlando
| 
| Malik Monk (26)
| Dwight Howard (17)
| Malik Monk (8)
| Amway Center17,018
| 35–45
|- style="background:#fcc;"
| 81
| April 8
| Indiana
| 
| Malik Monk (22)
| Dwight Howard (12)
| Frank Kaminsky (6)
| Spectrum Center16,629
| 35–46
|- style="background:#cfc;"
| 82
| April 10
| @ Indiana
| 
| Frank Kaminsky (24)
| Dwight Howard (17)
| Batum, Stone (6)
| Bankers Life Fieldhouse17,331
| 36–46

Standings

Transactions

Trades

Free agents

Re-signed

Additions

Subtractions

References

Charlotte Hornets seasons
Charlotte Hornets
Charlotte Hornets
Charlotte Hornets